is a Japanese Magic: The Gathering player. Nicknamed "King of the Faeries", he won two of his three Grand Prix titles with Faeries decks. In 2007, alongside teammate Kentarou Yamamoto, he finished second at Pro Tour San Diego, the only Pro Tour to use the Two-Headed Giant format.

Achievements

References 

Living people
Japanese Magic: The Gathering players
People from Tokyo
Year of birth missing (living people)